Working level (WL) is a historical unit of concentration of radioactive decay products of radon, applied to uranium mining environment. One working level refers to the concentration of short-lived decay products of radon in equilibrium with 3,700 Bq/m (100 pCi/L) in air. These decay products would emit 1.3 × 10 MeV in complete decay. The Nuclear Regulatory Commission uses this definition.

Working level month (WLM) is a closely related quantity, referring to exposure to one working level for 170 hours per month. This comes from assuming a 40-hour work week.

In 2002, the NRC regulations limited exposure in mines to 0.3 WL, which was comparable with the standards of International Commission on Radiological Protection at the time.

References

Units of radiation dose
Radon
Radiation protection
Mine safety